Lake Catani is an artificial lake in the Mount Buffalo National Park in Victoria, Australia. It was constructed in 1910 under the supervision and probably design of the Victorian Public Works engineer, Carlo Catani, to provide recreational facilities in the newly opened winter resort.

The Mount Buffalo National Park was established in 1898 with a 1166 hectare temporary reserve centred on the Eurobin Falls. In 1908 the area was increased to 9240 hectares and became permanent national park reserve. Lake Catani was completed in 1910 by construction of a mass concrete arched dam across Eurobin Creek at Haunted Gorge. The contract was let in 1908 for 2355 pounds. The dam blocked what was then known as the 'Underground River' and flooded Long Plain, in the process also covering an Aboriginal camp site. It was initially intended to provide water for the Grossman sawmill, which was milling timber for the construction of the Mount Buffalo Chalet.

Carlo Catani was appointed Public Works Engineer in 1882, and spent much of his career developing hydrological schemes such as the drainage of Koo Wee Rup and Elwood Swamps.

Lake Catani provided a popular venue for visitors, with boating and fishing in summer and ice-skating in winter. A golf course was also opened nearby at Tuckerbox Corner in 1911. A campground is located near the shores of the lake.

References

Catani